Jesse David Sheffield II, known as J. D. Sheffield (born August 13, 1960), is a physician from Gatesville, Texas, who was a Republican member of the Texas House of Representatives.

On July 14, 2020, Sheffield was defeated in his re-election effort by Stephenville, Texas attorney Shelby Slawson by over 20% in the Republican primary runoff.

Background
Sheffield currently practices at AdventHealth in Copperas Cove.

Political career

Texas House District 59 encompasses Comanche, Coryell, Erath, Hamilton, McCulloch, Mills, San Saba, Somervell in Central Texas. Sheffield was one of former House Speaker Joe Straus's loyal supporters.

2010 Republican primary for 59th district 
The 2010 election was Sheffield's first campaign for local or state office. He had served in student government during college. In the Republican primary in 2010, Sheffield polled 44.2 percent in his challenge to incumbent Sid Miller who had held the office since 2001.

2012 election for 59th district 
Two years after his unsuccessful challenge to Miller, Sheffield gained the Republican nomination with 54.8 percent of the ballots cast. Sheffield easily won in the November general election with 78% of the vote district wide against Bill Norris, the Democratic nominee and a retired school teacher from Dublin. Norris had effectively dropped out of the race due to health reasons but remained on the ballot.

2014 election 
Ralph lost his reelection bid in 2014.

2016 election 
Brent Graves, an auctioneer from Stephenville, ran against Sheffield for the Republican nomination in 2016. Graves lost to Sheffield 61% to 38%, district wide. Sheffield ran unopposed in the general election

2018 election 
In 2018, Sheffield defeated Chris Evans in the Republican primary. Sheffield ran unopposed in the general election.

2020 election
On July 14, 2020, Sheffield was defeated in his re-election effort by Stephenville, Texas attorney Shelby Slawson by over 20% in the Republican primary runoff. Slawson did not have an opponent in the 2020 general election.

Committees 
During his time in the Legislature, Sheffield served on the Texas House committees of Appropriations, Corrections, Public Health, Rules and Resolutions.

Legislative voting record

Personal life
He is married to Janice Gray Sheffield, a former District Clerk of Coryell County.  Sheffield attends First Baptist Church, a congregation in Gatesville.

References

1960 births
American osteopathic physicians
Living people
Republican Party members of the Texas House of Representatives
People from Loraine, Texas
People from Gatesville, Texas
Physicians from Texas
Western Texas College alumni
Howard Payne University alumni
University of North Texas Health Science Center alumni
21st-century American politicians